Recilia coronifer is a species of bug from the Cicadellidae family that can be found in Austria, Belgium, Bulgaria, Czech Republic, France, Germany, Greece, Hungary, Italy, Poland, Romania, Slovenia, Spain, Switzerland, the Netherlands, and Yugoslavia.

References

Hemiptera of Europe
Insects described in 1866
Recilia